Femina Miss India 2023 will be the 59th edition of the Femina Miss India beauty pageant. After a two-year hiatus, the entire processes of the competition from audition to the final will be held on-ground. On the finals to be held in April 2023 at Imphal, Manipur, each contestant from from 29 states (including Delhi) and a collective representative for all Union Territories (including Jammu and Kashmir), adding up to 30 participants will compete for the title. 

At the end of the event, Sini Shetty of Karnataka will crown her successor who will represent India at Miss World 2024 and also, Rubal Shekhawat of Rajasthan and Shinata Chauhan of Uttar Pradesh will crown the 1st and 2nd runners-up respectively.

Location & Format 
Manipur will host the grand finale of Femina Miss India 2023 in April 2023 for the first time in northeast India's history. In the presence of chief minister N. Biren Singh and Times of India Managing Director Vineet Jain at the CM's Secretariat in Imphal, an agreement to formalise the cooperation was signed between the Tourism Department, Government of Manipur, and the Times Group. MP Leishemba Sanajaoba, ministers Yumnam Khemchand Singh, Govindas Konthoujam, Awangbow Newmai, Dr Sapam Ranjan Singh, H Dingko Singh, Leishangthem Susindro Meitei, MLA Losii Dikho, chief secretary Rajesh Kumar, and Rohit Gopakumar, chief operational officer, Miss India Organisation, were also present.

After two years of online pageant operations, from registration to auditions, Femina Miss India 2023 will be held entirely offline. Contestants from all over the country will audition in front of a panel of experts in a venue chosen by the zone division. Following the audition, the organization's social media account will reveal top 5/12/20 state finalists. The state representative for the finals will be determined by a crowning ceremony for each zone. These 30 finalists will go through rigorous training and grooming activities such as workshops, photo shoots, awards night, sub-title competition, personal interviews, and many more. Furthermore, former Miss India and Bollywood actress Neha Dhupia will serve as a mentor to the state delegates.

Event Schedule 
The following is the list of the schedules of all the events of Femina Miss India 2023:

Contestants
The following is the list of the official delegates of Miss India 2023 representing 29 states +1 common winner from all Union territories of the country:
Color key

References

External links
 Miss India Official Website

2023
2023 beauty pageants
2023 in India
Beauty pageants in India